"Har du glemt" (English: Have you forgotten) is a song performed by Danish pop, dance and R&B singer and songwriter Medina. It was released on 29 October 2012 as a digital download in Denmark. The song was released as the first single of the re-release of For altid. The song peaked at number 4 on the Danish Singles Chart.

Track listing

Chart performance

Weekly charts

Release history

References

2012 singles
2012 songs
Songs written by Jeppe Federspiel
Songs written by Rasmus Stabell
Songs written by Medina (singer)
Medina (singer) songs